Distortionist is the second full-length album from Texas rock band The Murdocks, which was released September 14, 2010.

Track listing 

"OMG" – 2:17
"Infinite Pansy" – 2:42
"Bloodsicle" – 2:44
"Spirit of 95" – 2:02
"Tongues" – 3:09
"Die Together" – 3:07
"Playhouse Down" – 2:15
"Maiden in the Mirror" – 2:11
"Black Jesus Knocking" – 2:48
"Danger Goat" – 1:39
"Lords" – 3:31
"Sleepy Queen & Charlie Brown" – 2:48
"Where Are You Now?" – 3:38
"Aborted Baby Summers" – 2:38
"Widower" – 3:10

Release 

The album was released on limited edition vinyl (numbered out of 500), CD, and digital download.  For a limited time, the album could be pre-ordered in a few different bundles through The Murdocks official website.  The vinyl also included a vinyl-only bonus track.

References

2010 albums